The Central Highlands subregion is part of the Grampians region in western Victoria. 
It includes the municipalities of Rural City of Ararat, City of Ballarat, Golden Plains Shire, Shire of Hepburn, Shire of Moorabool, Shire of Pyrenees

The term is mainly used in a geological context to describe that part of the Great Dividing Range that is west of its alpine areas but does not extend to its western end in Victoria's west. The area is situated east of Ballarat, south of Bendigo, north and east of Melbourne, and west of the alpine areas. Major towns of the Central Highlands include Castlemaine, Creswick, Daylesford, Gisborne, Kyneton and Woodend. All these towns are located in what is usually referred to as the West Central Highlands. The more mountainous and more sparsely populated eastern part of the Central Highlands is referred to as the East Central Highlands and has extensive areas of temperate rainforest.

Rainforests
The East Victorian Central Highlands, including some of Melbourne's water catchments, contain cool temperate rainforests; dominated by myrtle beech and southern sassafras, with an understorey of ferns and mosses.  They may also contain eucalypt trees and blackwood.

Logging and environmental impact

The Central Highlands Regional Forest Agreement protects approximately 43.84% of rainforest stands in the Central Highlands of Victoria within dedicated reserves. Any rainforest that is not within these dedicated reserve is susceptible to the impacts of clearfell logging. 
A paper published in the US-based Proceedings of the National Academy of Sciences reports that the world's most carbon dense forest is found in the Central Highlands of Victoria.

Logging is proceeding in very significant regions of the Toolangi State Forest, including forest that provides habitat for the endangered Leadbeater's possum such as Nolan's Gully, and forest adjacent to Sylvia Creek Road.

See also
Yarra Ranges National Park

References

External links
https://web.archive.org/web/20080828020552/http://www.chsa.org.au/
Central Highlands at the Department of Agriculture, Fisheries and Forestry

 
Geography of Victoria (Australia)
Forests of Victoria (Australia)
Great Dividing Range
Highlands